In Greek mythology, Hippolochus ( Hippolokhos) was a Lycian prince as the son of King Bellerophon. He was probably the successor of the latter in the kingship of the Lycian land.

Family 
Hippolochus's mother was Philonoe, daughter of the King Iobates. In some accounts, she was also known as Alkimedousa, Anticleia, Pasandra or Cassandra. Hippolochus was the brother of Isander and Laodamia (Deidamia or Hippodamia), and the father or stepfather of Glaucus II (not to be confused with Glaucus I, who was the father or stepfather of Bellerophon).

Mythology 
Hippolochus sent his son to participate in the Trojan War and the latter became one of the distinguished Trojan Leaders."But Hippolochus begat me (i.e. Glaucus) and of him do I declare that I am sprung; and he sent me to Troy and straitly charged me ever to be bravest and pre-eminent above all, and not bring shame upon the race of my fathers, that were far the noblest in Ephyre and in wide Lycia."

Notes

References 

 Apollodorus, The Library with an English Translation by Sir James George Frazer, F.B.A., F.R.S. in 2 Volumes, Cambridge, MA, Harvard University Press; London, William Heinemann Ltd. 1921. ISBN 0-674-99135-4. Online version at the Perseus Digital Library. Greek text available from the same website.
 Diodorus Siculus, The Library of History translated by Charles Henry Oldfather. Twelve volumes. Loeb Classical Library. Cambridge, Massachusetts: Harvard University Press; London: William Heinemann, Ltd. 1989. Vol. 3. Books 4.59–8. Online version at Bill Thayer's Web Site
Diodorus Siculus, Bibliotheca Historica. Vol 1-2. Immanel Bekker. Ludwig Dindorf. Friedrich Vogel. in aedibus B. G. Teubneri. Leipzig. 1888-1890. Greek text available at the Perseus Digital Library.
Homer, The Iliad with an English Translation by A.T. Murray, Ph.D. in two volumes. Cambridge, MA., Harvard University Press; London, William Heinemann, Ltd. 1924. . Online version at the Perseus Digital Library.
 Homer, Homeri Opera in five volumes. Oxford, Oxford University Press. 1920. . Greek text available at the Perseus Digital Library.
Pseudo-Clement, Recognitions from Ante-Nicene Library Volume 8, translated by Smith, Rev. Thomas. T. & T. Clark, Edinburgh. 1867. Online version at theio.com

Princes in Greek mythology
Lycians
Lycia